The Spice MI-335 or (Spice Mi-355 Stellar Craze) is a mass market smartphone developed by the S mobility Ltd.(Spice mobile Corporation), that was announced on 2012 August. It is powered by an 800 MHz Qualcomm Snapdragon s1 processor and runs the Android operating system, version v2.3 (Gingerbread), planned upgrade to v4.0 (Ice Cream Sandwich). It includes an TFT LCD capacitive touchscreen, a 5-megapixel camera and Dual SIM. It belong to a series of Spice Stellar Craze.

Features
Spice mobile Corporation assured that Mi-355 comes with Android 2.3 which consists of a redesigned search framework, improved power management rich multimedia, faster, more intuitive text input, and enhanced graphics. Mi-355 is powered by Qualcomm Snapdragon 800 MHz S1 Processor which can handle multitasking and load applications. It is having 5 MP camera with Flash at rear and VGA at the front.

See also 
 Spice Stellar Mobile Series
 Spice Digital
 Spice Telecom
 Spice Stellar Nhance Mi-435
 Comparison of smartphones

References 

http://si2imobility.com/spicemobiles/our-products.php?pid=82

External links 
 http://www.saholic.com/mobile-phones/spice-stellar-craze-mi-355-1004698
 http://www.fonearena.com/blog/54144/spice-stellar-craze-mi-355-review.html
 http://www.gsmarena.com/spice_mi_355_stellar_craze-4991.php
 http://si2imobility.com/spicemobiles/our-products.php?pid=82

Smartphones
Android (operating system) devices
Mobile phones introduced in 2012